Ivan Yevstafyevich Khandoshkin (1747 – 29 or 30 March 1804) was a Russian Empire violinist and composer of Ukrainian Cossack origin. He has been described as "the finest Russian violinist of the eighteenth century".

Life 
Ivan Khandoshkin was born into a Cossack family near Myrhorod. He was related to the family of Hetman Danylo Apostol. Ivan's father Ostap was trained as a tailor, but eventually became a professional French horn and percussion player in the court orchestra of Tsar Peter III.

Ivan studied under Tito Porta with other Italian influences being Domenico dall’Oglio and Pietro Peri. He was a musician at the Russian court, of which he later became kapellmeister, from 1765 and he taught violin at the Yekaterinoslav Musical Academy, founded by Potemkin in 1785. After Potemkin's death Khandoshkin was forced to resign by Giuseppe Sarti who was considered his rival, and returned to St. Petersburg in 1789.

Works 
Khandoshkin's extant works comprise six violin sonatas and several variation cycles based on folk songs. His music (primarily for the violin) is comparable to music by his contemporaries such as Giuseppe Tartini's student Antonio Lolli (whose stunts on the violin preceded Paganini), Gaetano Pugnani, Ludwig Spohr, and many others.

His music was unfamiliar to the average western ear until recently. In 1996 Elena Denisova recorded three of his violin sonatas for Talking Music where they were released in the following year. In 2016 she performed them at the Salzburg Festival. Anastasia Khitruk performed several works and recorded them for Naxos in St. Petersburg's St. Catherine's Church in 2005.

Viola concerto 
The so-called "Khandoshkin viola concerto in C Major, written in 1801" published for the first time by the State Publishing House, Moscow, in 1947 and released in the former Soviet Union on Melodya, with Rudolf Barshai playing viola and conducting the Moscow Chamber Orchestra actually is not by Khandoshkin, but a musical hoax by Mikhail Goldstein.

References

External links 
 

Ukrainian people in the Russian Empire
1747 births
1804 deaths
Classical violinists from the Russian Empire
Male classical violinists
Russian classical violinists
Composers from the Russian Empire